USS Kalinin Bay (CVE-68) was a  of the United States Navy.

She  originally designated an AVG, was classified ACV-68 on 20 August 1942; laid down under a Maritime Commission contract 26 April 1943 by the Kaiser Shipbuilding Co., Inc., Vancouver, Washington; reclassified CVE-68 on 15 July 1943; launched 15 October 1943; sponsored by Mrs. Anna Mary Updegraff, mother of Captain William N. Updegraff, U.S. Navy; and commissioned 27 November at Astoria, Oregon, Captain C. R. Brown in command.

USS Kalinin Bay was named after a bay on the northern shore of Kruzof Island in the Alexander Archipelago of southeastern Alaska.

Service history
After shakedown along the Pacific Coast, Kalinin Bay departed San Diego 3 January 1944 for replenishment duty in the Pacific. Laden with troops and a cargo of planes, she steamed via Pearl Harbor for the Gilbert Islands, arriving off Tarawa Atoll 24 January to supply 5th Fleet carriers then engaged in the conquest of the Marshalls. For more than two weeks she provided logistic support from Tarawa to Majuro Atoll before returning to Alameda, California, 24 February.

Gilbert and Marshall Islands Campaign
With Composite Squadron 3 (VC-3) embarked 9 April, Kalinin Bay reached Majuro, Marshalls, 23 April; conducted ASW air patrols off Mili Atoll; and proceeded to Pearl Harbor 1 May to prepare for the Marianas operation. She departed Pearl Harbor 30 May; and, while en route to Saipan, she successfully evaded a Japanese torpedo that crossed her bow close aboard. Touching at Eniwetok 9 June, Kalinin Bay reached the eastern coast of Saipan 15 June and commenced air operations in support of the invasion. After repelling an enemy air attack at dusk on the 17th, she sailed 19 June to ferry planes to and from Eniwetok. Returning to Saipan 24 June, she resumed effective air strikes against enemy positions on the embattled island until 9 July when she steamed via Eniwetok for similar duty at Guam. Arriving 20 July, she launched direct support and ASW sorties until 2 August, then returned to Eniwetok to prepare for operations in the Palau Islands.

Mariana and Palau Islands Campaign
Kalinin Bay cleared Eniwetok 18 August and proceeded via Tulagi, Florida Island, to the Southern Palaus where she arrived 14 September with units of the 3rd Fleet. Ordered to furnish air support for the capture, occupation, and defense of Peleliu, Angaur, and Ngesebus, she launched air strikes to support landing operations. For 2 weeks her planes, flying almost 400 sorties, inflicted heavy damage on enemy ground installations and shipping. On 25 September, alone, they sank or destroyed three cargo transports and six landing barges.

Philippines Campaign
She departed the Palaus 30 September; and, upon arriving Seeadler Harbor, Manus Island, 3 October, she received a new commanding officer, Captain T. B. Williamson. Kalinin Bay departed Manus 12 October en route to the Philippine Islands. Ordered to provide air coverage and close air support during the bombardment and amphibious landings on Leyte Island, she arrived off Leyte 17 October. After furnishing air support during landings by Ranger units on Dinagat and Homonhon Islands in the eastern approaches to Leyte Gulf, she launched air strikes in support of invasion operations at Tacloban on the northeast coast of Leyte. Operating with Rear Admiral Clifton Sprague's "Taffy 3" (Task Unit 77.4.3), which consisted of 6 escort carriers and a screen of 3 destroyers and 4 destroyer escorts, Kalinin Bay sailed to the east of Leyte and Samar as her planes, flying 244 sorties from 18 to 24 October, struck and destroyed enemy installations and airfields on Leyte, Samar, Cebu, Negros, and Panay Islands.

The Battle off Samar
Steaming about 60 miles east of Samar before dawn 25 October, Taffy 3 prepared to launch the day's initial air strikes. At 0647, Rear Admiral Sprague received word that a sizable Japanese fleet was approaching from the northwest. Comprising four battleships, eight cruisers, and eleven destroyers, Vice Admiral Takeo Kurita's Center Force steadily closed and at 0658 opened fire on Taffy 3.

So began the Battle off Samar—one of the most memorable engagements in U.S. naval history. Outnumbered and outgunned, the slower Taffy 3 seemed fated for disaster; but the American ships defied the odds and gamely accepted the enemy's challenge.

Kalinin Bay accelerated to flank speed, and, despite fire from three enemy cruisers, she launched her planes, ordering the pilots "to attack the Japanese task force and proceed to Tacloban airstrip, Leyte, to rearm and regas." As salvos fell "with disconcerting rapidity" increasingly nearer Kalinin Bay, her planes, striking the enemy force with bombs, rockets, and gunfire, inflicted heavy damage on the closing ships.

As the trailing ship in the escort caravan, Kalinin Bay came under intense enemy fire. Though partially protected by chemical smoke, by a timely rain squall, and by valiant counterattacks of screening destroyers and destroyer escorts, she took the first of 15 direct hits at 0750. Fired from an enemy battleship, the large caliber shell (14 inch or 16 inch) struck the starboard side of the hangar deck just abaft the forward elevator.

By 0800, the enemy cruisers, which were steaming off her port quarter, closed to within 18,000 yards. Kalinin Bay gamely responded to their straddling salvos with rapid fire from her single 5 inch gun, which only intensified the enemy fire. Three 8 inch, armor-piercing projectiles struck her within minutes of each other. At 0825, the carrier's  5-incher scored a direct hit from 16,000 yards on the No. 2 turret of a Nachi-class heavy cruiser, and a second hit shortly thereafter forced the enemy ship to withdraw temporarily from formation.

At 0830, five enemy destroyers steamed over the horizon off her starboard quarter. The closing ships opened fire from about 14,500 yards, and, as screening ships engaged the cruisers and laid down concealing smoke, Kalinin Bay shifted her fire, and, for the next hour, traded shots with Japan's Destroyer Squadron 10. Many salvos exploded close aboard or passed directly overhead, and, though no destroyer fire hit Kalinin Bay directly, she took ten more 8 inch hits from the now-obscured cruisers. One shell passed through the flight deck and into the communications area, where it destroyed all the radar and radio equipment.

Under heavy attack from the air and harassed by incessant fire from American destroyers and destroyer escorts, the enemy cruisers broke off action and turned northward at 0920. As the torpedoes approached the escort carriers, they slowed down. A Grumman TBF Avenger from  strafed and exploded two torpedoes in Kalinin Bay'''s wake about 100 yards astern, and a shell from the latter's 5 inch gun deflected a third from a collision course with her stern.

At about 0930, as the enemy ships fired parting salvos and reversed course northward, Kalinin Bay scored a direct hit amidships on a retreating destroyer. Five minutes later, she ceased fire and retired southward with the surviving ships of Taffy 3. At 1050, the task unit came under a concentrated air attack. During the 40-minute battle, the first attack from a Kamikaze unit in World War II, all except  were damaged. One plane of Lieutenant Yukio Seki and his Shikishima squadron crashed through St. Lo's flight deck and exploded her torpedo and bomb magazine, mortally wounding the carrier. Four diving planes attacked Kalinin Bay from astern and the starboard quarter. Intense fire splashed two close aboard; but a third plane crashed into the port side of the flight deck, damaging it badly. The fourth hit destroyed the aft port stack.

As part of Taffy 3, Kalinin Bay had prevented a Japanese penetration into Leyte Gulf and saved General Douglas MacArthur's beachhead in the Philippines. At a cost of five ships and hundreds of  men, Taffy 3, aided by her own planes and those of "Taffy 2" (Task Unit 77.4.2), sank three enemy cruisers, seriously damaged several other ships, and turned back the "most powerful surface fleet which Japan had sent to sea since the Battle of Midway."

Despite the battle damage, Taffy 3 cleared the air of attacking planes; at noon, the escort carriers retired southeastward while their escort searched for survivors from St. Lo. Though Kalinin Bay suffered extensive structural damage during the morning's furious action, she counted only 5 dead among her 60 casualties. Weary and battle scarred, Kalinin Bay was awarded the Presidential Unit Citation for heroic conduct as a unit of Taffy 3. She steamed via Woendi, Schouten Islands, to Manus, arriving 1 November for emergency repairs. Getting under way for the United States 7 November, the escort carrier reached San Diego 27 November for permanent repairs and alterations.

End of career
Repairs completed 18 January 1945, the veteran escort carrier departed San Diego 20 January to ferry planes and men to Pearl Harbor and Guam. For more than 8 months, she served as a replenishment carrier in the Pacific Carrier Transport Squadron; and, during six cruises between the West Coast and Pearl Harbor, Eniwetok, and Guam, she transported more than 600 planes. Departing San Diego 2 September, she steamed to the Philippines, arriving at Samar 28 September to participate in Operation Magic Carpet. With 1,048 men embarked, she departed Samar 1 October and arrived San Francisco 19 October.

After conducting two more voyages between California and Pearl Harbor, Kalinin Bay departed San Diego 8 December for the Far East. On 25 December, while she steamed to Yokosuka, Japan, an intense storm heavily damaged her flight deck. Arriving the 27th, she received emergency repairs, then sailed 3 January 1946 for the West Coast and arrived San Diego 17 January. On 13 February, she proceeded to the eastern seaboard, reaching Boston 9 March. Kalinin Bay was decommissioned 15 May, and she was sold for scrap 8 December to Patapsco Steel Co., Baltimore, Maryland.

Awards
In addition to the Presidential Unit Citation, Kalinin Bay'' received five battle stars for World War II service.

References

 

Casablanca-class escort carriers
World War II escort aircraft carriers of the United States
Ships built in Vancouver, Washington
1943 ships
S4-S2-BB3 ships